Bridgeton Historic District is located in Bridgeton, Cumberland County, New Jersey. The district was added to the National Register of Historic Places on October 29, 1982.

See also
National Register of Historic Places listings in Cumberland County, New Jersey
Cumberland County Courthouse

References

Bridgeton, New Jersey
Historic districts on the National Register of Historic Places in New Jersey
Houses on the National Register of Historic Places in New Jersey
Geography of Cumberland County, New Jersey
National Register of Historic Places in Cumberland County, New Jersey
Houses in Cumberland County, New Jersey
New Jersey Register of Historic Places